This list comprises all players who have played for FC Cincinnati which dates from the team's inaugural Major League Soccer season in 2019 to present.

A "†" denotes players who did not appear in a single match but were available for fixtures. Players who were acquired by the team but were not available to play in matches (e.g. selected in a draft but not signed, or acquired in a trade but immediately traded away) are not listed.

A "‡" denotes players who also played for FC Cincinnati in the USL before expansion to MLS.

Bolded players are currently under contract by FC Cincinnati.

Stats include all competitive matches (MLS, MLS Cup Playoffs, U.S. Open Cup, CONCACAF Champions League, etc).

All stats accurate as of match played November 7, 2021.

Players

Outfield players

Goalkeepers

By nationality 
MLS regulations allow for eight international roster slots per team to be used on non-domestic players. However, this limit can be exceeded by trading international slots with another MLS team. Overseas players are exempt from counting towards this total if they have permanent residency rights in the U.S. (green card holder), other special dispensation such as refugee or asylum status, or qualify under the Homegrown International Rule. In total, 59 players representing 25 different countries have played for FC Cincinnati.

Note: Countries indicate national team as defined under FIFA eligibility rules. Players may hold more than one non-FIFA nationality.

References

Sources 

 By Season | MLSsoccer.com

Cincinnati
 
Association football player non-biographical articles